St Ita's is a Gaelic football and hurling club based in the village of Gortroe, (near Youghal), County Cork, Ireland. It competes in competitions organized by Cork county board and the Imokilly divisional board. In 2013, Seamus Harnedy became the first player from the club to play with the Cork senior hurling team. He was a major success and ended up with being included in the 2013 and 2018 All-Star team.

History
History records show that in 1901 St Ita's played under the name of Gortroe in the East Cork Hurling division their opponents were Blackrock. The records do not give scores but it is shown that Blackrock advanced to the next stage of the competition. The following year 1902 its recorded that Gortroe played against Evergreen in the firsts and against United Nationals in the seconds. The records do not give scores but Gortroe lost out to Evergreen who then advanced to the semi finals against Dungourney. For the records Dungourney were eventual winners.
The club was reformed in 1971. The club performed at Junior B in hurling until 1980 when the club won the East Cork Junior B Hurling Championship. The club performed at Junior A level for a number of years, but was eventually regraded back to Junior B. In 2007, St Ita's made history as they won the Cork Junior B Hurling Championship for the first time. They went on to compete in the Munster Junior B Club Hurling Championship, losing by 2 point to Ballingarry of Tipperary

Honours
 Cork Under-21 Hurling Championship Runners-Up 2017 (with Killeagh)
 Cork Under-21 B Hurling Championship Winners (1) 2014 (with Killeagh)
 Cork Premier Minor Hurling Championship Runners- Up (2) 2014 (with Killeagh), 2016 (with Killeagh)
 Cork Minor A Hurling Championship Winners (1) 2006 (with (with Killeagh)
 East Cork Junior A Hurling Championship: (1) 2021
 East Cork Junior A Hurling League Div 3 Winners (1) 2010
 Munster Junior B Club Hurling Championship (0) Runners-Up 2007
 Cork Junior B Hurling Championship Winners (1) 2007
 East Cork Junior B Hurling Final County Championship Winners (1) 2005
 East Cork Junior B Hurling Div 2 League Winners (1) 2005
 East Cork Junior B Hurling Championship Winners (2) 1951, 1980

Scor
1992 St Ita's Senior Scor Set Dancers became Cork County Champions
1993 St Ita's Scor na Paisti confined to primary schools Were crowned Cork County Champions
1994 St Ita's Scor na Nog Set Dancers were crowned Cork County Champion

Notable players
Séamus Harnedy

References

External links
 St Ita's GAA Official Website
 Cork GAA Results
 East Cork GAA

Gaelic games clubs in County Cork
Gaelic football clubs in County Cork
Hurling clubs in County Cork